Anand Nagar Junction railway station is located in Pharenda city of Maharajganj district, Uttar Pradesh. It serves Pharenda city. Its code is 'ANDN'. It has three platforms. Passenger, DEMU, Express, and Superfast trains including Humsafar Exp. halt here.

Trains

 Gorakhpur–Panvel Express (via Barhni)
 Lokmanya Express
 Gorakhpur–Lokmanya Tilak Terminus Express (via Barhni)
 Bandra Terminus–Gorakhpur Antyodaya Express
 Gorakhpur−Badshahnagar Intercity Express
 Gorakhpur–Sitapur Express (via Barhni)
 Gorakhpur–Bandra Terminus Express (via Barhni)
 Gorakhpur–Anand Vihar Terminal Humsafar Express (via Barhni)
 Durg–Nautanwa Express (via Sultanpur)
 Durg–Nautanwa Express (via Varanasi)
 Gorakhpur–Nautanwa Express

References 

Lucknow NER railway division
Railway stations in Maharajganj district
Railway junction stations in Uttar Pradesh